Mohamed Kouki (born 21 April 1975) is a Tunisian football manager who is currently the manager of Saudi Arabian club Al-Arabi.

Honours

Manager
Damac
 Saudi First Division runners-up: 2018–19 (Promotion to Pro League)

Al-Tai
 Saudi First Division third place: 2020–21 (Promotion to Pro League)

References

1975 births
Living people
Tunisian football managers
AS Kasserine managers
EGS Gafsa managers
Al-Ahly Shendi managers
Al-Merrikh SC managers
Olympique Béja managers
AS Gabès managers
ES Métlaoui managers
Stade Tunisien managers
Stade Gabèsien managers
Damac FC managers
US Tataouine managers
Al-Ta'ee managers
Tunisian expatriate football managers
Expatriate football managers in Sudan
Tunisian expatriate sportspeople in Sudan
Expatriate football managers in Saudi Arabia
Tunisian expatriate sportspeople in Saudi Arabia
Saudi First Division League managers
Saudi Professional League managers